Kushla Peak is the peak rising to 2588 m in Veregava Ridge, central Sentinel Range in Ellsworth Mountains, Antarctica.  It surmounts Berisad Glacier to the north-northwest and Hansen Glacier to the southeast.

The peak is named after the settlement of Kushla in Southern Bulgaria.

Location
US mapping in 1961, updated in 1988.

See also
 Mountains in Antarctica

Maps
 Vinson Massif.  Scale 1:250 000 topographic map.  Reston, Virginia: US Geological Survey, 1988.

Notes

External links
 Kushla Peak. SCAR Composite Antarctic Gazetteer.
 Bulgarian Antarctic Gazetteer. Antarctic Place-names Commission. (details in Bulgarian, basic data in English)

External links
 Kushla Peak. Copernix satellite image

Bulgaria and the Antarctic
Ellsworth Mountains
Mountains of Ellsworth Land